is a role-playing video game and sports video game for the Nintendo DS developed and published by Level-5. There are 3 versions of the game: Spark and Bomber, released on July 1, 2010 in Japan, followed on December 16, 2010 by The Ogre.

All three versions of this game were included in an updated re-release compilation titled Inazuma Eleven 1-2-3: Endo Mamoru's Legend for the Nintendo 3DS, released on December 27, 2012 in Japan. They were later released separately in Europe both digitally and physically, as "Lightning Bolt" (originally "Spark") and "Bomb Blast" (originally "Bomber") in Europe on September 27, 2013. The release of the third version, as "Team Ogre Attacks!", followed on February 13, 2014.

Plot
Now that Raimon have beaten Aliea Gakuen and saved the world, a new challenge awaits for soccer players known from all over Japan, the Football Frontier International. Eventually, the team representing Japan in the competition is picked and are known as Inazuma Japan.

They now have to win the Asia preliminaries to compete in the actual worldwide tournament, facing teams from England, America, Italy and more. Throughout there adventure in the FFI, they also come across angels and devils that they have to defeat, otherwise the Demon King will be revived after its 1000-year sleep.

There also seems to be a new villain trying to gain something, Garshield Bayhan, who is using soccer as a tool to take over the world; and wanting to create a war.

Inazuma Japan has to go through other struggles such as having an unknown coach known as the 'cursed coach', Gouenji Shuuya having the struggle of staying in Inazuma Japan as his father wants him to go to Germany to become a doctor, and more.

Development
At Japan Expo 2013, producer Akihiro Hino confirmed that the "Spark" (renamed "Lightning Bolt") and "Bomber" (renamed "Bomb Blast") versions would be released for Nintendo 3DS in Europe on September 27, 2013. The third version (renamed "Team Ogre Attacks!") was also announced during the Nintendo Direct on November 13, 2013, and was released on February 13, 2014.

Reception

All three versions of the game had toppled the Media Create's list during the first sales week, selling over half a million copies.

Thomas Whitehead of Nintendo Life have praised its impressive design level but added that there is not enough of gameplay value to justify an upgrade.

References

External links

 

2010 video games
Association football video games
Inazuma Eleven video games
Level-5 (company) games
Nintendo DS games
Nintendo 3DS games
Nintendo 3DS eShop games
Nintendo games
Role-playing video games
Video games developed in Japan
Video games with alternative versions
Video games scored by Yasunori Mitsuda